The men's eight (M8+) competition at the 1984 Summer Olympics took place at Lake Casitas in Ventura County, California, United States. It was held from 31 July to 5 August. There were 7 boats (63 competitors) from 7 nations, with each nation limited to a single boat in the event. New Zealand had won the last two world championships, and the other strong team, East Germany, was absent from the event due to the Eastern Bloc boycott. This made New Zealand the strong favourite. But the final was won by Canada, with the USA and Australia the other medallists, and New Zealand coming a disappointing fourth.

Background

This was the 19th appearance of the event. Rowing had been on the programme in 1896 but was cancelled due to bad weather. The men's eight has been held every time that rowing has been contested, beginning in 1900.

East Germany had for many years been the dominating country for this boat class. From the 1976 Summer Olympics to the 1980 Summer Olympics, the country won every gold at Olympic and World Rowing Championships level. At the 1981 World Rowing Championships, East Germany came in fourth place, with the Soviet Union winning gold. In 1982 and 1983, the event was won by New Zealand, with East Germany coming second on both occasions. With the Eastern Bloc boycott affecting the 1984 Summer Olympics, New Zealand was thus regarded as the strong favourite. Another medal contender was the United States; they had won the 1983 Pan American Games.

Chile made its debut in the event. The United States made its 16th appearance, most among nations to that point.

Previous M8+ competitions

Competition format

The "eight" event featured nine-person boats, with eight rowers and a coxswain. It was a sweep rowing event, with the rowers each having one oar (and thus each rowing on one side). This rowing competition consisted of two main rounds (semifinals and finals), as well as a repechage round after the semifinals. However, neither the semifinals nor the repechage eliminated any boats; all seven teams advanced to the "A" final, and no "B" final was held. The course used the 2000 metres distance that became the Olympic standard in 1912 (with the exception of 1948). Races were held in up to six lanes, except the final in which (very unusually) seven boats raced.

 Semifinals: Two heats with three or four boats each. The top boat in each semifinal (2 boats total) went to the "A" final, while the remaining boats (5 total) went to the repechage.
 Repechage: A single heat with five boats. All five advanced to the "A" final.
 Finals: The "A" final consisted of all seven boats, competing for the medals and 4th through 7th place.

Schedule

All times are Pacific Daylight Time (UTC-7)

Results

Semifinal

The two semifinal heats were rowed on 31 July. The winner of each heat advanced to the final, while the remaining teams went to the repechage.

Semifinal 1

Semifinal 2

Repechage

One heat was rowed in the repechage on 2 August. All five teams advanced to the final.

Final

All seven teams that entered the competition rowed in a single final on 5 August.

Footnotes

Notes

References 
 
Volume 1 Part 1
Volume 1 Part 2
Volume 1 Part 3
 
Volume 2 Part 1
Volume 2 Part 2
Volume 2 Part 3 (page 469 onwards)

Rowing at the 1984 Summer Olympics
Men's events at the 1984 Summer Olympics